MBWA is an acronym that may be short for:

Met Basketball Writers Association, a group of sports writers in the greater New York City metropolitan area that helps determine the annual recipient of the Haggerty Award
Mobile Broadband Wireless Access, an IEEE Standard to enable worldwide deployment of multi-vendor interoperable mobile broadband wireless access networks
Management by wandering around